The third Wescot-Williams cabinet was the Third Cabinet of Sint Maarten installed following the achievement of constituent country status of Sint Maarten within the Kingdom of the Netherlands on 10 October 2010. The cabinet was a coalition between the United People's Party, the Democratic Party, and independent member of parliament Romain Laville.

The cabinet was formed following the collapse of the Second Wescot-Williams cabinet in May 2013, when the two Democratic Party MPs and Romain Laville pulled their support from National Alliance led government.

Composition
The cabinet was composed as follows:

|Prime Minister
|Sarah Wescot-Williams
|DP
|14 June 2013
|-
|Minister of Housing, Physical Planning, and Environment
|Maurice A. Lake
|UP
|14 June 2013
|-
|Minister of Finance
|Martinus J. Hassink
|
|14 June 2013
|-
|Minister of Justice
|Dennis L. Richardson
|
|14 June 2013
|-
|rowspan="2"|Minister of Tourism, Economic Affairs, Transport and Telecommunications
|Sarah Wescot-Williams (interim)
|DP
|14 June 2013
|-
|Thadeus Richardson
|
|25 July 2013
|-
|Minister of Healthcare, Social Development, and Labor
|Cornelius de Weever
| DP
|14 June 2013
|-
|Minister of Education, Culture, Youth, and Sports
|Patricia D. Lourens-Philip
|UP
|14 June 2013
|-
|Minister Plenipotentiary of Sint Maarten
|Mathias Voges
|DP
|14 June 2013
|-
|Deputy Minister Plenipotentiary of Sint Maarten
|Josianne Fleming-Artsen
|UP
|25 July 2013
|}

References

Wescot-Williams II
2013 establishments in Sint Maarten
Cabinets established in 2013
2014 disestablishments in Sint Maarten
Cabinets disestablished in 2014